Keith Bailey (born 21 February 1964, in Dublin) is a former Irish cricketer. He was a right-handed batsman and a wicket-keeper. He made his debut for Ireland in June 1985 against Sussex, and went on to play for Ireland on eleven occasions. Of these, one match had first-class status and two had List A status. His last game was against Wales in July 1991.

References 
 CricketEurope Stats Zone profile
 Cricket Archive profile
 Cricinfo profile

1964 births
Irish cricketers
Living people
Cricketers from Dublin (city)
People educated at Wesley College, Dublin
Wicket-keepers